Sun squirrels (genus Heliosciurus), form a taxon of squirrels under the subfamily Xerinae and the tribe Protoxerini. They are only found in sub-Saharan Africa.

Either the habit of basking in the sun on tree branches or the tail being commonly used as a sunshade gave this group its common name.

Sun squirrels have been implicated in the spread of human monkeypox in the Democratic Republic of the Congo.

There are six species in the genus:
 Gambian sun squirrel, Heliosciurus gambianus
 Mutable sun squirrel, Heliosciurus mutabilis
 Small sun squirrel, Heliosciurus punctatus
 Red-legged sun squirrel, Heliosciurus rufobrachium
 Ruwenzori sun squirrel, Heliosciurus ruwenzorii
 Zanj sun squirrel, Heliosciurus undulatus

References

Nowak, Ronald M. (1999), Walker's Mammals of the World, 6th edition, Baltimore and London: The Johns Hopkins University Press, pp 1281–1282.
list of the squirrels in the world www.squirrels.org, archived at web.archive.org